is a figure in Japanese mythology.

Hoori may also refer to:

 Hoori (Islam) (hooriyah in female form), a native inhabitant of heaven in Islamic belief
 Hooria Mashhour, Yemeni politician
 Hoori Noorani, Pakistani classical dancer, artist and publisher

See also
 Hoor, Iran